Mary Card (24 September 1861 – 13 October 1940) was an Australian designer and educator.

Early life
Mary Card, born in Castlemaine, Victoria, was the eldest of twelve children born to David Card, a jeweller and watchmaker and Harriet Card (née Watson-Wooldridge) a beautiful and talented actress. Mary's secondary education at The Ladies College of the Presbyterian Church in Melbourne (now called Presbyterian Ladies' College, Melbourne) was followed by a year at the National Gallery of Victoria Art School in Melbourne.

Career

In 1903 deafness forced Mary to sell the school she had begun in 1889 with her mother and sisters. She tried writing short stories for The Australasian newspaper (later Australasian Post) but because she could not earn a living in this way decided to become ‘a professional designer and teacher of needlework through the press’. She gained experience by refurbishing Irish crochet lace when it returned to fashion in the early 1900s. 
Her first designs were published, anonymously, in the prestigious American Ladies Home Journal. Then in 1910, patterns bearing her name were featured in the Melbourne magazine, New Idea, later renamed Everylady’s Journal and in a series of books. An excellent interview by her mentor W.A. Somerset Shum was published in Everylady's Journal  and later appeared as Who is Mary Card? A Chat in which the author supplies some Interesting Personalities.
Her fresh new designs with clear, detailed, well-illustrated instructions were very popular and she soon became a celebrity. The Australian plants and animals she included in some designs were a welcome change from the English ones. Her publishers generously promoted her magazine articles, many books and Giant Charts, sometimes in full page advertisements in New Idea and Everylady's Journal. 
Her Charts were revolutionary, with easy-to-follow graphs and working instructions for her ‘big picture’ designs. The first in the series, the Wild Rose & Pigeon Supper cloth was released to great acclaim around the world in 1917. She was an astute business woman and during this time sold crochet hooks, thread and the transfers for some of her designs directly to the public.

America, England and Australia
In 1918 at the age of 57, Mary moved to New York to broaden her horizons. Needlecraft magazine issued more than 100 of her designs, including the Statue of Liberty and the American flag. Another magazine, Modern Priscilla, showed illustrations of two of her most beautiful Grapevine & Silvereye designs and supplied the charts by mail order. The book of crochet patterns in fine thread she self-published was later re-issued by Needlecraft. She prepared a book of jackets and jumpers in coarse thread for the Dexter Yarn Company.
She felt restricted in her small apartment in the centre of New York so moved to England in about the mid-1920s and built a home in rural Berkshire. The English countryside and gardens inspired many of her later designs. 
She began a new series of English Charts, continued with Needlecraft in America until 1935 and issued 29 designs from 1931 to 1939 in Australian Home Beautiful which was more suitable for her later work than New Idea. The later charts carried endorsements for Coats Mercer Crochet® cotton and Old Bleach Linen®. Some of her previously published work was included in the Semco Crochet Book issued by a progressive needlework supply company in Melbourne in about 1933. 
Australian friends who visited Mary in England told her first biographer, Barbara Jefferis, that she also designed for the London firm Weldon and Co  who issued the popular Weldon’s Practical Needlework and other fashion and needlework publications. Weldon, along with the other English needlework magazines, did not disclose the names of the designers. However, a few of the Weldon designs with features of her work are in a recent book which brings together all her afternoon tea cloths. 
She spent most of the last years of her life in England, occasionally returning to Australia. She was with her sister Harriet at Olinda, Victoria when she died on 13 October 1940.

Achievements
Mary was a particularly prolific and versatile designer. The series of spreadsheets describing her more than 400 designs show the broad scope of her work and assist in finding particular patterns. Her best work was in filet or picture crochet. Her large flowing ‘big picture’ afternoon teacloths, with living creatures enhanced by lacet backgrounds have few if any rivals. She was an excellent teacher of many good techniques.
Mary enriched the lives of women across the world with her delightful crochet lace designs from the early 1900s until the late 1930s. At a time when women were full-time homemakers, making crochet lace was an important part of many women’s lives in a way that may be hard to understand today. Needlework was an enjoyable, fashionable and socially correct pastime. Women were proud to wear and decorate their homes with the finished items.
Mary was more than a remarkable designer. She was also a hard-working, warm-hearted, clever, spirited, enterprising and resilient woman. She was an active Secretary of her district’s Patriotic League during World War I. She also helped people with speech and hearing difficulties before she closed her school.

Patterns
An extensive collection of her patterns is available online. Mary’s ten books, more than 30 of her charts, selected magazine articles and as series of spreadsheets are in a high resolution Digital Collection which may be downloaded without charge. Many other designs are in six books on her life and work. Further details including generous illustrations and descriptions of crochet lace techniques accompany some of the rewritten patterns in these books. A few early patterns not available online are in Everylady’s Journal and New Idea held by the State Library Victoria. Details, including page numbers are in the spreadsheets.
Many of her patterns were published in at least two of the three countries in which she worked.

Recognition of her Contribution to the Social Life of the Nation
Mary has been acknowledged in various ways:
Obituaries in three Melbourne daily papers, The Age, The Argus and The Herald (Sun), the Australian Home Beautiful magazine and the New York Times.
She is listed in the Australian Dictionary of Biography.
The home she built at Olinda on the outskirts of Melbourne is heritage listed.
A street has been named after her in Gungahlin, a suburb of Canberra.
She was included along with 40 other needlewomen and designers in a comprehensive work on 500 Australian women artists.

References

External links
 Mary Card's Crochet Book No. 4 (1917), online via Trove, National Library of Australia.
 "About Mary Card"

1861 births
1940 deaths
Australian designers
Australian women of World War I
People from Castlemaine, Victoria
19th-century Australian women
People educated at the Presbyterian Ladies' College, Melbourne
National Gallery of Victoria Art School alumni
Artists from Victoria (Australia)